Klaus Schwarzkopf (18 December 1922, in Neuruppin – 21 June 1991, in Bochum) was a German actor.  From 1971 until 1978 he starred in the Norddeutscher Rundfunk version of the popular television crime series Tatort. He was also known as a respected stage actor and for being the German dubbing voice of Peter Falk as Columbo during the 1970s.

Schwarzkopf was gay, but never admitted it. Schwarzkopf died in 1991 of AIDS.

Filmography

Film
1956: Bonjour Kathrin (directed by Karl Anton), as Neighbour (uncredited)
1961: Freddy and the Millionaire (directed by Paul May), as Policeman (voice, uncredited)
1965: Praetorius (directed by Kurt Hoffmann), as Dr. Watzmann
1967: Glorious Times at the Spessart Inn (directed by Kurt Hoffmann), as Roland
1968: Artists Under the Big Top: Perplexed (directed by Alexander Kluge), as Gerloff, philologist
1971: Und Jimmy ging zum Regenbogen (directed by Alfred Vohrer), as Sirius
1971: Jailbreak in Hamburg (directed by Wolfgang Staudte), as Police commissioner Knudsen
1972: The Stuff That Dreams Are Made Of (directed by Alfred Vohrer), as Dr. Wolfgang Erkner
1973: All People Will Be Brothers (directed by Alfred Vohrer), as Boris Minski
1974: Three Men in the Snow (directed by Alfred Vohrer), as Otto Tobler
1974: One or the Other of Us (directed by Wolfgang Petersen), as Professor Rüdiger Kolczyk
1974: Only the Wind Knows the Answer (directed by Alfred Vohrer), as Vicar
1985:  (directed by Bernhard Wicki), as Spiros the Greek

Television

1964: Nachtzug D 106 (TV film), as Zugkellner
1964:  (TV film), as Harry Burdick
1966: Zehn Prozent (TV film), as Oberregierungsrat Frühwirth
1968: Spravedlnost pro Selvina (TV film), as Frank Selvin
1969: Der Kommissar: Ratten der Großstadt (TV series episode), as Krüger
1969: Bitte recht freundlich, es wird geschossen (TV film), as Frank Crawford
1969:  (TV film), as Vendrino
1970:  (TV miniseries), as Petrowitsch
1971: Der Kommissar: Besuch bei Alberti (TV series episode), as Gerhard Sidessen
1971: Tatort:  (TV series episode), as Kommissar Finke
1972: Tatort:  (TV series episode), as Kommissar Finke
1973: Der Kommissar: Rudek (TV series episode), as Georg Hauffe
1973: Tatort:  (TV series episode), as Kommissar Finke
1974: Tatort:  (TV series episode), as Kommissar Finke
1974: Der Kommissar: Tod eines Landstreichers (TV series episode), as Pock
1974: Eintausend Milliarden (TV film), as Müller-Mend
1975: Die unfreiwilligen Reisen des Moritz August Benjowski (TV miniseries), as Don Pacheco
1975: Tatort:  (TV series episode), as Kommissar Finke
1976: Sladek oder Die schwarze Armee (TV film, based on a play by Ödön von Horváth), as Untersuchungsrichter
1977: Tatort: Reifezeugnis (TV series episode), as Kommissar Finke
1977: Die Dämonen (TV miniseries, based on Dostoyevsky's Demons), as Anton L. Grigoreff / Narrator
1978: Tatort:  (TV series episode), as Kommissar Finke
1979:  (TV miniseries, based on Thomas Mann's Buddenbrooks), as Jesselmeyer
1980: Derrick: Pricker (TV series episode), as Alfred Pricker
1982: The Confessions of Felix Krull (TV miniseries, based on Thomas Mann's Confessions of Felix Krull), as Felix Krull's Father
1982: Das blaue Bidet (based on an essay by Joseph Breitbach) (TV film), as Barbe
1983: Gin Romme (TV film)
1983: Die Rückkehr der Zeitmaschine (TV film), as Dr. Erasmus Beilowski
1985: Derrick: Lange Nacht für Derrick (TV series episode), as Dr. Bomann
1985: Der Fahnder: S.O.S. am Sonntag (TV series episode), as Willie Spiegel
1986: Liebling Kreuzberg: Doppeleinsatz (TV series episode), as Dagobert Gruber
1986: Derrick: Die Nacht, in der Ronda starb (TV series episode), as Dr. Walter Schenk
1986:  (TV film), as Léon Bisquet
1987–1992: Praxis Bülowbogen (TV series, 18 episodes), as "Gleisdreieck"
1980: Derrick: Kein Risiko (TV series episode), as Ingo Wecker
1988: The Old Fox: Ein ganz gewöhnlicher Mord (TV series episode), as Rudolf Ballat
1990: Die Richterin (TV film), as Benjamin Hofmann

References

External links
 

1922 births
1991 deaths
German male television actors
AIDS-related deaths in Germany
German gay actors
People from Neuruppin
German male film actors
20th-century German male actors
20th-century German LGBT people